The Fifth Avenue Synagogue (קהלת עטרת צבי, Congregation Ateret Tsvi) is an Orthodox Jewish synagogue located at 5 East 62nd Street between Fifth and Madison Avenues in the Upper East Side neighborhood of Manhattan, New York City.

Founding
The synagogue was founded in 1958, by former members of Congregation Zichron Ephraim (now called Park East Synagogue) who opposed that congregation's decision to seat men and women together during services. Henry Hirsch, Myrtle Hirsch, Leib Merkin and Hermann Merkin were among the congregation's founders. Author Herman Wouk was an early member of the Fifth Avenue Synagogue.

Rabbi Emanuel Rackman was chosen in 1967 to succeed Rabbi Immanuel Jakobovits, who had been the founding Rabbi of the congregation in 1959 and been elected to serve as Chief Rabbi of the United Hebrew Congregations of the Commonwealth. Rabbi Rackman served until 1977, when he was selected to serve as President of Bar-Ilan University. Rabbi Nisson Shulman served as the congregation's rabbi from 1977 until 1985. Rabbi Sol Roth assumed the leadership of the synagogue in 1986. Rabbi Yaakov Kermaier assumed leadership of Fifth Avenue Synagogue in 2003 and made aliyah with his family in 2015.

Rabbi Eli Babich, who was the associate Rabbi of Fifth Avenue Synagogue since 2013, was named the head Rabbi in 2019 . The Chazzan is the noted cantor Joseph Malovany.

Building
The stone-clad building was designed by Percival Goodman, an architect who described himself as "an agnostic who was converted by Hitler." Goodman sought to interpret Jewish tradition in modern ways in the more than 50 synagogues he designed. Herman Wouk described Goodman's design as a "traditional Sephardic layout" with the bimah and aron in the center area facing rows of seats, thereby taking advantage of the depth of the property. In May, 2010, a new mikvah at the Fifth Avenue Synagogue was dedicated. Funding for construction was provided by Ira Rennert and family.

In popular culture

The synagogue appeared as a "cool 1950's apartment house" in a 2003 advertisement for the Infiniti Q45 luxury car in an ad created by the TBWA\Chiat\Day. The agency received permission to use the building in the background of the shot under the proviso that it not be identifiable, so the address on the awning was changed to the non-existent "63003 77th Street". The congregation was paid an undisclosed fee.

In the 1986 Woody Allen film, Hannah and her Sisters the building is panned across while being criticized for its architectural incongruity — "That's disgusting. That's really terrible." — after a shot of the consistent facades of the rest of the block.

References
Notes

External links

Synagogues in Manhattan
Orthodox synagogues in New York City
Upper East Side
Jewish organizations established in 1958
1958 establishments in New York City
Merkin family
Synagogues completed in 1958
Percival Goodman synagogues
Modernist architecture in New York City